Luiz Felipe Bonetti Sanguini (born 22 March 2002) is a Brazilian professional footballer who plays as a midfielder for Greek club Santorini.

References

2002 births
Living people
Brazilian footballers
Super League Greece 2 players
Ionikos F.C. players
Association football midfielders
Footballers from São Paulo